Nå may refer to:

Nå is the Norwegian word for now
Nå, Ullensvang, a village in Ullensvang municipality, Vestland county, Norway
Nå (magazine), a Norwegian magazine that was published from 1952 until 1995

See also
Na (disambiguation)